The 2013 edition of the Canadian Polaris Music Prize was presented on September 23, 2013 at The Carlu event theatre in Toronto, Ontario.

The award was won by Godspeed You! Black Emperor for their album 'Allelujah! Don't Bend! Ascend!. The band subsequently released a statement criticizing the prize's gala trappings in a time of austerity, asserting that "organizing a gala just so musicians can compete against each other for a novelty-sized cheque doesn't serve the cause of righteous music at all. Maybe the next celebration should happen in a cruddier hall, without the corporate banners and culture overlords." Despite their criticism the band accepted the award, but donated the prize money to a Quebec-based program of music education in prisons.

Shortlist
The prize's 10-album shortlist was announced on July 16.

Longlist

The prize's preliminary 40-album longlist was announced on June 13.

References

External links
 Polaris Music Prize

2013 in Canadian music
2013 music awards
2013